The Freedom and Equality (WiR), previously called Union of the Left (UL); is a minor social-democratic political party in Poland founded on 20 March 2005 through the union of several left-wing organisations and parties, including: Worker's Democracy, Young Socialists, Antyklerykalna Partia Postępu RACJA, Centrolewica Rzeczypospolitej Polskiej, Demokratyczna Partia Lewicy, Nowa Lewica, Polska Partia Pracy, Polska Partia Socjalistyczna.
and Unia Pracy.

The party is supported by the "Democratic Women's Union" (Demokratyczna Unia Kobiet), Polish LGBT rights groups, and several small left-wing organisations.

References

2005 establishments in Poland
Democratic socialist parties in Europe
Political parties established in 2005
Political parties in Poland
Social democratic parties in Poland